The Technical University of Kenya Handball Club was established in 2003 in Nairobi, Kenya. It has since gone on to establish itself as one of Kenya's most successful clubs.

Men's team 
The men's team won the university's league (KUSA Handball League) in 2008, 2009,2010 and 2011. They are one of the better teams in the country having finished third in the Kenya Handball Federation national league for three seasons in a row from 2008-2010.

History 

In 2003, The Technical University of Kenya registered their men's team to compete in the Kenya Handball Federation League, with Duncan Ayiemba, the former Aga Khan High School, Nairobi skipper, as the captain of the team. The club went on to register mixed results in the league as well as in the prestigious Joe Muigwa Cup that season. The team was maintained for the next seasons until 2007 when Peter Mwathi, who was the National Women's team coach, took over.
He kicked off his tenure by undertaking an aggressive recruitment drive with the aim of replacing the outgoing players with young, skilled and gifted players fresh from high school. This resulted in the signing of influential players such as Lewis Nyaga, Paul Mwangi and Adrian Emunye (Aga Khan High School, Nairobi), John Wekesa and Kevin Lukorito (Kimilili High School), Cyprian Maina (Mombasa Polytechnic), Mike Indasi, Clarence Oyule, Meshak Odero (Musingu High School, Francis Manuthu (Kiambu High School), Marin Ekode AND Eddie Kavai (Mukumu Boys High School), Alex Ndeto (Tala Boys High School) and Emmanuel Kidiga (Mangu High school).
These were added to the bulk of experienced players present at the club such as Evans Juma and Duncan Ayiemba resulted in a winning machine that challenged for honors on all fronts and in the 2008-2009 season, the team finished in third position of the KHF National League and Joe Muigwa Cup behind Cereals handball and Ulinzi Handball clubs.
The 2010-2011 season saw the arrival of Fibian Mathenge (Mangu High School) to a team that was about to witness the last term of Peter Mwathi as head coach, who has since gone on to take over at Strathmore University Handball. The team registered good results that season by winning the KUSA Handball league while finishing third in KHF National League and the Joe Muigwa Cup.
Henry Savulane, a former Kenya International, has since taken over the reins at the club.
Henry Savulane has made 2 more signings that includes Stephen Obanya and Kevin Kiarie to replace Victor Otwoma who went to Cereals handball club. The team average age is 24yrs

Titles and seasons (men's team)

Current squad

External links
KHF Name Squad for All Africa Games Qualifiers
Cereals Retain National Women League Handball Trophy

Handball clubs
Handball in Kenya
Sports teams in Kenya
Sport in Nairobi